Clifford "Cliff" Chilcott (28 June 1898 – 18 July 1970) was a Canadian freestyle sport wrestler who competed in the 1924 Summer Olympics.

In 1924 he finished fourth in the freestyle featherweight tournament. At the 1930 British Empire Games, he won the gold medal in the featherweight class.

References

1898 births
1970 deaths
Olympic wrestlers of Canada
Wrestlers at the 1924 Summer Olympics
Canadian male sport wrestlers
Wrestlers at the 1930 British Empire Games
Commonwealth Games gold medallists for Canada
Sportspeople from Blackpool
British emigrants to Canada
Commonwealth Games medallists in wrestling
Medallists at the 1930 British Empire Games